Mark Moran may refer to:

 Mark Moran (criminal) (1964–2000), criminal of the infamous Moran family from Melbourne, Australia,
 Mark Moran (rugby league), Wales rugby league footballer
 Mark Moran (soccer) (born 1954), retired American soccer midfielder
 Mark Moran (writer), co-creator of the Weird N.J. magazine and website